Pelayo Suárez López (born 9 July 1998) is a Spanish footballer who plays as a central defender for SD Logroñés, on loan from Sporting de Gijón.

Club career
Born in Gijón, Asturias, García joined Sporting de Gijón's Mareo in 2009, from Xeitosa CF. He made his senior debut with the reserves on 20 December 2014 at the age of just 16, coming on as a second-half substitute in a 0–1 Segunda División B away loss against SD Compostela.

Suárez was definitely promoted to the B-team in 2017, but spent the most of the campaign sidelined due to a pubalgia. He renewed his contract for a further two seasons on 28 June 2019, and scored his first senior goal the following 2 February, netting the opener in a 1–3 loss at Coruxo FC.

Suárez made his first team debut on 11 October 2020, replacing Jean-Sylvain Babin in a 0–1 away loss against Real Oviedo, which was the 109th Asturian derby. The following 30 August, he moved to Primera División RFEF side SD Logroñés on a one-year loan deal.

Personal life
Suárez's father Juanma and his cousin Monchu were also footballers. The former was a midfielder, while the latter was a forward; both represented Sporting in the 1990s.

References

External links
 
 
 

1998 births
Living people
Footballers from Gijón
Spanish footballers
Association football defenders
Segunda División players
Segunda División B players
Tercera División players
Sporting de Gijón B players
Sporting de Gijón players
SD Logroñés players
Spain youth international footballers